Lieutenant-General John Wimburn Laurie,  (1 October 1835 – 19 May 1912) was a soldier and political figure in Nova Scotia, Canada for thirty years and then returned to England.

Military career 
He was born in London, England, the son of John Laurie and Eliza Helen Collett, and educated at Harrow, at Dresden, and at the Royal Military College, Sandhurst. He entered the British Army in 1853 and served in 4th Kings Own Regiment in Crimea (1855) and Mauritius (1857) on his way to India (1858). He served in South Africa (1881). While in Nova Scotia, Laurie also served during the North-West Rebellion of 1885, at which point he was the highest-ranking officer in Canada. He achieved the rank of Lieutenant General in 1887.

Nova Scotia
In 1862 he arrived in Halifax, Nova Scotia, married Frances Robie Collins (daughter of Enos Collins) in 1863, and developed Oakfield, Nova Scotia on the shores of Grand Lake. Laurie was warden for Halifax County in 1880. He was appointed Lieutenant General (1881), became an MP for Shelburne in the Canadian House of Commons (1887-1891).

In 1886, he greeted James J. Bremner and the Halifax Volunteer Battalion upon their return from the North-West Rebellion. He was defeated by Thomas Robertson in the 1887 general election; Robertson's election was overturned on appeal and Laurie won the subsequent by-election later the same year. That election was declared void but Laurie was elected again in 1888. He represented Shelburne in the House of Commons of Canada from 1887 to 1891 as a Conservative member.

Laurie was a prominent freemason, serving as Grand Master for Nova Scotia and provincial grand master for South Wales. During his time in Nova Scotia, he served as president of the Central Board of Agriculture. Laurie was chairman of the Canadian trade section of the London Chamber of Commerce. He was named a knight of the Order of St. Sava and of the Order of the Red Cross of Serbia.

England 
Although retaining Oakfield, he returned to England in 1889 and was an unsuccessful candidate for a seat in the British House of Commons in 1892. He was elected a member of the British House of Commons at the next general election, representing Pembroke and Haverfordwest from 1895 to 1906. He entered local politics, becoming Mayor of Paddington in 1907.

He was appointed a Companion of the Order of the Bath (CB) civil division in the November 1902 Birthday Honours list, and advanced to a Companion of the military division in the 1905 Birthday Honours.

Family

His oldest son John Laurie Jr. was killed in the Second Boer War and is listed on the South African War Memorial in Halifax and the Memorial Arch at the Royal Military College of Canada. He was also the father of George Brenton Laurie who was killed in World War One.

Mrs. Laurie, of Oakfield, Nova Scotia returned to Nova Scotia after her husband died and while George was in WW1.

Legacy 
 built St. Margaret's of Scotland Church (See Heritage Trust of Nova Scotia)
  namesake of Laurie Park, Oakfield, Nova Scotia.

electoral record

See also 
Military history of Nova Scotia

References 
 
 "Oakfield and its Founder [Col. John Wimburn Laurie]"; by Miss Margaret Laurie; Vol #24 (1938); pp. 15.
Endnotes

External links
 Letters of Lt.-Col. George Brenton Laurie

1835 births
1912 deaths
People educated at Harrow School
Graduates of the Royal Military College, Sandhurst
Conservative Party of Canada (1867–1942) MPs
Conservative Party (UK) MPs for Welsh constituencies
Members of the House of Commons of Canada from Nova Scotia
UK MPs 1895–1900
UK MPs 1900–1906
Companions of the Order of the Bath
Members of the Parliament of the United Kingdom for Pembrokeshire constituencies
Knights of the Order of St. Sava
Mayors of places in Greater London
Members of Paddington Metropolitan Borough Council